Zeboyd Games is a Indie developer of 8-bit and 16-bit-style indie role-playing games .  Zeboyd is run and its games are created by Robert Boyd and William Stiernberg.  The studio got its start with Breath of Death VII and Cthulhu Saves the World; later made the third and fourth installments in the Penny Arcade Adventures series; and has since switched to the 16-bit style RPG Cosmic Star Heroine and Cthulhu Saves Christmas.

Interactive Novels

Epiphany in Spaaace!
Epiphany In Spaaace! is an interactive novel released on October 20, 2009 on Xbox Live Indie Games parodying sci-fi through the ongoing travails of Philemon K. Bort (possible Captain of the U.S.S. Epiphany, one of the latest additions to the Universal Galactic Space Corps fleet).  It has sold about 500-700 copies.

Molly the Were-Zompire
The interactive novel Molly the Were-Zompire was released on Xbox Live Indie Games on December 10, 2009.  It's the story of Molly Desper, who is turned into a were-zombie-vampire  It sold about 500-700 copies.

2D RPGs

Breath of Death VII: The Beginning
Co-created with William Stiernberg, Breath of Death VII: The Beginning was released on April 22, 2010, on Xbox Live Indie Games.  A retro-style comedy RPG, Dem the Skeleton Knight, Sara the Ghost Historian, Lita the Vampire Techie, and Erik the Zombie Prince are customized via a branching ability tree.  Robert felt that most turn-based RPGs were too slow, so Breath of Death VII battles employ a combo system based on player character choices with non-player characters receiving a strength bonus based on how many turns the fight has gone, giving the battles a pseudo time limit.  Additionally, the number of encounters in an area are limited.  With more than 40,000 sales, Breath of Death VII has a 2/3 conversion rate from the trial.

Despite its title, it is the only game of its "series", and the previous "six" do not exist. The title is simply a parody of serial RPGs whose sequels are often not in chronological order.

Cthulhu Saves the World
Co-created with Bill Stiernberg, Cthulhu Saves the World was released on December 30, 2010 on Xbox Live.  Cthulhu, the squid-faced, winged god created by H. P. Lovecraft emerges from the sea after centuries of slumber only to find his dark powers immediately sealed away by a mysterious holy wizard. A narrator then informs the player that the only way to break the curse is to become a true hero. Quickly breaking the fourth wall, Cthulhu informs the narrator that he was eavesdropping and now knows how to break the curse.  Like Breath of Death VII, Cthulhu Saves the World has a branching level-up system and caps random encounters in an area (there is an option where the player can choose from the menu to have additional encounters).  The "Hey There, Cthulhu" music video was produced by Nakatomi HMC using the parody song written and recorded by Eben Brooks. All in-game music was composed and recorded by Gordon McNeil.

Zeboyd Games began a Kickstarter fundraiser towards development of an enhanced version of the game for PC and Xbox 360 platforms; it was more than successfully funded on February 16, 2011, garnering over twice the fundraiser's goal. The new version was officially announced on March 14, 2011, retitling the game as "Cthulhu Saves the World: Super Hyper Enhanced Championship Edition Alpha Diamond DX Plus Alpha FES HD - Premium Enhanced Game of the Year Collector's Edition (without Avatars!)". The PC version was released on July 13, 2011 together with Breath of Death VII on Valve's Steam service. The Steam version was a financial success, making more revenue in its first week of release than in a year and a half on the Xbox 360.  By November 21, 2011, the "Zeboyd Games Combo Pack" (Cthulhu Saves the World & Breath of Death VII) had sold over 100,000 copies on Steam in less than four months after release.

Penny Arcade Adventures: On the Rain-Slick Precipice of Darkness: Episode 3
Zeboyd Games developed Episode 3 of Penny Arcade Adventures: On the Rain-Slick Precipice of Darkness, which was released on June 25, 2012. Robert Boyd and Bill Stiernberg, along with Jerry Holkins and Jeff Kalles, hosted a panel at PAX East in Boston on April 6, 2012.

Penny Arcade Adventures: On the Rain-Slick Precipice of Darkness: Episode 4
Zeboyd Games developed Episode 4, which was released on June 7, 2013.

Cosmic Star Heroine

Cosmic Star Heroine is a science fiction RPG that was released in April 2017 for Microsoft Windows and PlayStation 4. A  PS Vita and Nintendo Switch version followed in 2018. It received positive reviews.

Cthulhu Saves Christmas

Zeboyd officially announced Cthulhu Saves Christmas, a prequel to Cthulhu Saves the World, on their personal website on July 29, 2019. It was subsequently released on PC on December 23, 2019. In the side-scrolling JRPG, Cthulhu teams up with Santa Claus’s granddaughter to stop Jack Frost before Christmas is cancelled forever. Along the way he fights Krampus, Mari Lwyd, and other “Christmas League of Evil villains” in turn-based combat. He also builds “R'lyehtionship” levels with his friends.

This Way Madness Lies

This Way Madness Lies is a Shakespeare-themed magical girl RPG that was released on November 10, 2022 for Microsoft Windows.

References

External links
Official Zeboyd Games website
Hey There Cthulhu: The Photomontage Video

American companies established in 2009
Video game companies established in 2009
Companies based in Lake Arrowhead, California
Video game companies of the United States
Video game development companies
2009 establishments in California
Privately held companies based in California